Mosa Rural LLG is a local-level government (LLG) of West New Britain Province, Papua New Guinea.

Wards
01. Gamapili
02. Bugal
03. Kavui
04. Gaopore
05. Laheri
06. Bebere
07. Tamba
08. Sarakolok
86. Mosa Urban

References

Local-level governments of West New Britain Province